Rabbi Wolf Gold (Ze'ev Gold, born Zev Krawczynski on May 2, 1889, died 8 April 1956) was a rabbi, Jewish activist, and one of the signatories of the Israeli declaration of independence

Born in Szczuczyn he was a descendant on his father's side from at least eight generations of rabbis. Gold's first teacher was his maternal grandfather, Rabbi Yehoshuah Goldwasser - a leader in Hovevei Zion. Later he studied at the Mir yeshiva under Rabbi Eliyahu Baruch Kamei. From there Gold moved on to study in Lida at Yeshiva Torah Vo'Da'as - the yeshiva of Rabbi Yitzchak Yaacov Reines where Torah was combined with secular studies. Gold was ordained as a Rabbi at the age of 17 by Rabbi Eliezer Rabinowitz of Minsk, and succeeded his father-in-law Rabbi Moshe Reichler, as rabbi in Juteka.

At the age of 18, he moved to the United States, where he served as rabbi in several communities including South Chicago, Scranton, Pennsylvania (until 1912), Congregation Beth Jacob Ohev Sholom in Williamsburg, Brooklyn (1912–1919), San Francisco (until 1924) and Congregation Shomrei Emunah of Borough Park, Brooklyn (1928-1935).

He was a pioneer in establishing Orthodox Judaism in the United States. He founded the Williamsburg Talmud Torah, and in 1917 founded Yeshiva Torah Vodaas. He started the Beth Moshe hospital (at 404 Hart Street in Bushwick, Brooklyn in 1920. In 1947 Beth Moses merged with Israel Zion Hospital to become Maimonides Hospital) and an orphanage in Brooklyn and also founded a Hebrew teachers training college in San Francisco.

In 1914, Rabbi Gold invited Rabbi Meir Berlin, secretary of the World Mizrachi, to come to New York to organize a branch of Mizrachi in the United States. For the next 40 years, Rabbi Gold traveled throughout the United States and Canada organizing chapters of the Mizrachi movement and became president of American Mizrachi in 1932.

In 1935, he emigrated to Palestine, where he became the head of the Department of Torah Education and Culture in the Diaspora in which capacity he was instrumental in establishing new educational institutions within the Diaspora, devoting himself particularly to the educational needs of North African Jewry.

During World War II, he was involved in the widespread Zionist opposition to the British White Paper of 1939 and worked to rescue European Jewry from the Holocaust. In 1943, he traveled to the United States where he participated as a speaker on behalf of European Jewry at the Rabbis' march in Washington.

He was a member of the Jewish Agency Executive, heading the Department for Jerusalem Development.

He served as Vice-President of the Provisional State Council and went on to sign the  Israeli declaration of independence in 1948. He served on the founding committee of Bar-Ilan University.

On 8 April 1956, Rabbi Gold died in Jerusalem and was buried near his lifelong friend Rabbi Meir Berlin.

Two years after his death in Jerusalem, a Jewish woman's teacher training seminary was established in the city and named after him; Machon Gold.

His grandson,  Harav Yaakov Katz, is a Rosh Yeshiva at Yeshivat Netiv Aryeh.

See also
Zev Wolf (disambiguation page)

External links

The Central Zionist Archives in Jerusalem site. Office of Rabbi Ze'ev Gold (S58).

References

1889 births
1956 deaths
20th-century Polish rabbis
American Orthodox rabbis
Israeli Orthodox rabbis
Signatories of the Israeli Declaration of Independence
Orthodox rabbis in Mandatory Palestine
Heads of the Jewish Agency for Israel
Mir Yeshiva alumni
20th-century American rabbis
People from Grajewo County